Kent is a male given name.  It is also often a surname (see Kent (surname).)

People
 Kent Benson (born 1954), American former collegiate and professional basketball player
 Kent Broadhurst (born 1940), American actor, playwright, screenwriter and painter
 Kent Brown (disambiguation)
 Kent Emanuel (born 1992), American professional baseball pitcher
 Kent Haruf (1943–2014), American novelist
 Kent Henry (1948–2009), American guitarist and songwriter
 Kent Hrbek (born 1960), former American Major League Baseball player
 Kent Hughes (disambiguation)
 Kent Jones (disambiguation)
 Kent Lee (1923–2017), Vice Admiral of the United States Navy
 Kent McCord (born 1942), American actor
 Kent Nagano (born 1951), American conductor
 Kent Rogers (1923–1944), American actor
 Kent Smith (1907–1985), American actor
 Kent Tong (born 1958), Hong Kong actor
 Kent Williams (disambiguation)

Characters
Kent, a fictional character from the tactical role-playing game Fire Emblem: The Blazing Blade
 Kent Brockman, a fictional character from the animated television series The Simpsons
 Kent Mansley, a main antagonist from the animated science fiction film The Iron Giant

Masculine given names
English masculine given names